David George Edward Henry Pratt, 6th Marquess Camden (born August 13, 1930) is a British peer. He was a member of the House of Lords from 1983 to 1999.

The son of John Pratt, 5th Marquess Camden, and his wife Marjorie Minna Jenkins, he was educated at Eton College and was commissioned into the Scots Guards.

He was a director of Clive Discount Company between 1958 and 1969.

On 22 March 1983, he succeeded as Marquess Camden (1812), Earl of Camden (1786), Earl of Brecknock (1812), Viscount Bayham of Bayham Abbey (1786), and Baron Camden of Camden Place (1765).

On 20 April 1961, he married Virginia Ann Finlaison, daughter of Francis Harry Hume Finlaison; they were divorced in 1984, having had three children:
Lady Samantha Caroline Pratt (born 1964)
James William John Pratt, Earl of Brecknock (born 1965)
Jonathan Bruce Charles Pratt (born 1970, died 1976)

In 2003, Camden was living at Wherwell House, Andover, Hampshire.

Notes

1930 births
Peers
People educated at Eton College 
Scots Guards officers
Camden, David Pratt, 6th Marquess
Living people